Rhinella diptycha, sometimes referred to as Cope's toad, Schneider's toad, cururu toad, or rococo toad, is a toad found in northern Argentina, Paraguay, Uruguay, eastern Bolivia, and eastern and southern Brazil. It is one of three rather similar species sometimes referred to as "cururu toads" in Brazil, the others being R. jimi and R. marina (cane toad).

Rhinella diptycha is a widespread and very common species that occurs in a variety of habitats but most commonly in open and urban ones. It breeds in permanent and temporary ponds, preferring ones without much vegetation. Its natural habitats include dry savanna, freshwater marshes, and intermittent freshwater marshes. It is threatened by habitat loss. It is sometimes kept as a pet, but pet trade is not occurring at levels that would constitute a threat.

References

diptycha
Amphibians of Argentina
Amphibians of Bolivia
Amphibians of Brazil
Fauna of the Pantanal
Amphibians of Paraguay
Amphibians of Uruguay
Amphibians described in 1894